Yvette Hardman Edmondson (born Yvette Hardman) was the editor of Limnology and Oceanography the premier journal of the Association for the Sciences of Limnology and Oceanography (1968 to 1986) and was an aquatic scientist known for her research on bacteria in aquatic systems.

Education and personal life 
Edmondson graduated from the Walden School in New York City in 1932. She obtained her undergraduate degree in literature from Bennington College in 1936, which was the first class to graduate from Bennington College. In 1938, Edmondson obtained an M.S. in Bacteriology from University of Minnesota and minor in Agricultural Biochemistry with a thesis examining filamentous bacteria in lakes. Edmonson then moved to the University of Wisconsin Madison where she worked with Elizabeth McCoy and Perry Wilson. She completed a Ph.D. in Bacteriology in 1940 with a dissertation titled "The influence of solid surfaces upon lake bacteria", research that was later published in the scientific literature.

In the first term of her Ph.D. at the University of Wisconsin Madison, she met Walles T. Edmondson ('Tommy') whom she helped collect rotifers for his research. They were married in New Haven on September 26, 1941 while Tommy was working at Yale University.

In 1990, a newsletter from the University of Wisconsin asked Edmondson about the lack of women in sciences in 1930s and 1940s and her response was:

Career 
Following her Ph.D., Edmondson was a teaching fellow in science at Bennington College and she remained there during World War Two. In 1945 a Science news article described her leave of absence from Bennington to work at Woods Hole Oceanographic Institution on salt water ponds. There she first worked with her husband quantifying how the addition of nutrients altered the growth of phytoplankton with the goal of estimating options for aquaculture; she focused on how oysters responded to higher levels of food that resulted from fertilization of the water. In 1937, Edmondson (then Yvette Hardman) was a visiting investigator at Woods Hole Oceanographic Institution, where she worked with Selman Waksman and others on marine microbiology. During the same period, Kenneth Thimann, Edmondson, and Babette Radner published their work on the production of anthrocyanins by cultures of Spirodela. In 1949, Yvette and her husband moved to Seattle when Tommy took a position at the University of Washington.

Edmondson worked with the ecologist G. Evelyn Hutchinson and co-authored Hutchinson's final Treatise on Limnology that was published in 1993. In 1971, Edmondson dedicated a special issue of Limnology and Oceanography to the life and accomplishments of G. Evelyn Hutchinson. Edmondson also memorialized Hutchinson in Limnology and Oceanography after his death in 1991.

From 1968 (volume 13) until 1986 (volume 31), Edmondson was the editor of Limnology & Oceanography, the journal of the Association for the Sciences of Limnology and Oceanography. In her work as editor, Edmondson was deliberate in sharing details about the scope of the journal, the types of manuscripts acceptable for publication, the key role of reviewers that may be unnoticed by a manuscript's authors, and a detailed accounting of each step in the review process at the journal. While some authors, e.g., the microbiologist Richard Morita,  were disappointed to learn their manuscripts did not meet the criteria for the journal, Edmondson's work as editor was recognized in the obituary Robert Paine wrote for the Limnology and Oceanography Bulletin upon the occasion of her death in 2006 when he emphasized her contributions to the evolution of the journal, a portion of which she had described in her final issue as editor.

Honors 
 Association for the Sciences of Limnology and Oceanographys Distinguished Service Award renamed the Tommy and Yvette Edmondson Distinguished Service Award (2009)
 University of Washington award: W.T. and Yvette H. Edmondson Graduate Student Award for graduate student research in biological limnology
Distinguished Service Award, American Society of Limnology and Oceanography (1999)
Alumni award, Bennington College (1979)

Reference section

External links 
 Photo of Yvette Hardman in Bennington College's collection of entering students (1932-1939)

2006 deaths
1915 births
Academic journal editors
American microbiologists
Bennington College alumni
University of Wisconsin–Madison alumni
University of Minnesota alumni
University of Washington faculty